The 2006 FIG Rhythmic Gymnastics World Cup Final was the seventh edition of the Rhythmic Gymnastics World Cup Final, held from November 17 to November 18, 2006 in Mie, Japan. The competition was officially organized by the International Gymnastics Federation as the last stage of a series of competitions through the 2005–2006 season.

Medalists

Medal table

References

Rhythmic Gymnastics World Cup
International gymnastics competitions hosted by Japan
2006 in gymnastics